Alicia mirabilis, commonly known as the berried anemone, is a species of sea anemone in the family Aliciidae. It changes shape as night falls expanding its column and tentacles to catch its food.  It can be found in the Azores, Portugal, Spain and the  Mediterranean and Red Seas.

Description
By day, Alicia mirabilis resembles a pile of berries, thus the common name berried anemone. By night, it expands its column to up to 40 cm tall and opens its tentacles. When fully extended, the tentacles may actually be longer than the column height. Both the tentacles and the "berries" contain stinging cells.

References

External links
Alicia mirabilis on www.itis.gov

 

Aliciidae
Animals described in 1861
Taxa named by James Yate Johnson
Cnidarians of the Atlantic Ocean
Fauna of the Mediterranean Sea